The Hokukano-Ualapue Complex is a National Historic Landmarked pre-contact archaeological site on several properties adjacent to Hawaii Route 450 in Ualapue, on Molokaʻi island.  The complex includes six heiaus and two fishponds. The complex is one of the most important collections of native Hawaiian sites in Hawaiʻi.  It was designated a National Historic Landmark in 1962 and added to the National Register of Historic Places on October 15, 1966.

'Ili'ili'ōpae Heiau 
The largest and most impressive of the six heiau in the complex is 'Ili'ili'ōpae, the largest heiau on Molokai and the second largest in all Hawaii.  It consists of four tiers, rising to a stone platform measuring 287 feet by 87 feet.  It is located half a mile north of Highway 450, and can be reached by a track up the Mahulepu valley from the highway near milepost 15.

According to legend 'Ili'ili'ōpae Heiau was constructed in a single night with boulders passed from hand to hand along a chain of menehune from the Wailau valley on the north shore.  A hiking trail from the temple to Wailau has now fallen into disuse and is overgrown.

Fish ponds
The two ponds considered part of this complex are Keawanui Pond and Ualapue Pond. It is a loko kuapā, or walled pond, which distinctively uses a curved portion of the natural coastline and a small island as part of its isolating barrier. The barrier wall is pierced in several places by sluice gates. The second pond, Ualapue Pond, is located on the shore at the eponymous village, and is also a loko kuapa, the seawall built out of coral and basalt. There are two sluice gates in the wall.

See also
National Register of Historic Places listings in Maui County, Hawaii
List of National Historic Landmarks in Hawaii

References

Heiau
National Historic Landmarks in Hawaii
Archaeological sites in Hawaii
Buildings and structures in Maui County, Hawaii
Molokai
Fishponds of Hawaii
Historic districts on the National Register of Historic Places in Hawaii
Native Hawaiian culture
National Register of Historic Places in Maui County, Hawaii
Hawaii Register of Historic Places